A cretic (also Cretic, amphimacer  and sometimes paeon diagyios) is a metrical foot containing three syllables: long, short, long ( ¯ ˘ ¯ ).  In Greek poetry, the cretic was usually a form of paeonic or aeolic verse.  However, any line mixing iambs and trochees could employ a cretic foot as a transition.  In other words, a poetic line might have two iambs and two trochees, with a cretic foot in between.

Words which include a cretic (e.g. Latin cīvitās and its various inflections) cannot be used in works composed in dactylic hexameter or dactylic pentameter.

In Latin, cretics were used for composition both in comedy and tragedy. They are fairly frequent in Plautus but rarer in Terence. (See Metres of Roman comedy.)

For Romance language poetry, the cretic has been a common form in folk poetry, whether in proverbs or tags.  Additionally, some English poets have responded to the naturally iambic nature of English and the need for a trochaic initial substitution to employ a cretic foot.  That is, it is commonplace for English poetry to employ a trochee in the first position of an otherwise iambic line, and some poets have consciously worked with cretic lines and fully cretic measures.  English Renaissance songs employed cretic dimeter fairly frequently (e.g. "Shall I die? Shall I fly?" attributed to William Shakespeare).  Because the cretic, in stress-based prosody, is natural for a comparison or antithesis, it is well suited to advertising slogans and adages.

Cultural references
— Ohio! the editor crowed in high treble from his uplifted scarlet face. My Ohio!
— A perfect cretic! the professor said. Long, short and long. Ulysses (1922), James Joyce.

Notes

References
Getty, Robert J., A. Thomas Cole, and T.V.F. Brogan.  "Cretic" in Preminger, Alex and T. V. F. Brogan, eds.  The New Princeton Encyclopedia of Poetry and Poetics.  Princeton, NJ: Princeton UP, 1993.  248.
Squire, Irving, Musical Dictionary, Adamant Media Corporation; Replica edition (October 30, 2001) .

Advertising
Metrical feet